The Camomile Lawn is a television adaptation of the 1984 book of the same name by Mary Wesley, produced by Glenn Wilhide and Sophie Belhetchet at ZED Ltd for Channel 4, directed by Peter Hall. It was adapted from Wesley's novel by Ken Taylor and first broadcast in 1992.

Set just before and during the Second World War, with an aftermath that takes place in the mid 1980s, the action begins at the Cornish country house of Helena Cuthbertson.

The title is drawn from a camomile lawn between the house and the sea cliffs on which some significant events take place.

Outline
The production begins in August 1939, when young adults Oliver (Toby Stephens), Calypso (Jennifer Ehle), Polly (Tara Fitzgerald) and her brother Walter are visiting their disorganised Aunt Helena (Felicity Kendal) and her husband Richard Cuthbertson (Paul Eddington) in their house by the sea in Cornwall. Ten-year-old Sophy (Rebecca Hall), the daughter of Richard’s late half sister, lives with them and is delighted with the arrival of her cousins, especially Oliver. The family is often visited by the twin sons of the rector of the parish and by Max and Monika Erstweiler, a Jewish refugee couple from Austria that the rector has taken in, who are missing their only son, Pauli, reported to be in a German concentration camp. The cousins invent 'The Terror Run', a cliff path dash that they race at night by a full moon, and are joined by some of the grown ups, and Sophy is determined to run it, too. However, on a daylight practice run, a coastguard exposes himself to Sophy, with surprising results.

After fighting in the Spanish Civil War, Oliver is depressed and disenchanted, but develops a crush on Calypso. She fends him off, determined to make the most of her beauty and marry a much richer man.

Polly is intelligent and practical, and when the Second World War breaks out in September 1939 she joins the War Office to work for Military intelligence, while her brother Walter joins the Royal Navy, Oliver the army, and the twins the Royal Air Force. Meanwhile, Max and Monika are interned as enemy aliens. Calypso marries Hector Grant, a Scottish landowner and member of parliament, but has many affairs. The Erstweilers are released, and Helena begins an affair with Max, Richard with Monika. Walter is killed at sea, and Calypso has a son, Hamish, shortly after her London house has been hit by a bomb, with Sophy acting as midwife. Pauli Erstweiler is reported to have died in Dachau, but in fact he survives the war.

In 1984, more than forty years on, the survivors meet again at the house in Cornwall for the funeral of Max Erstweiler. He became a well-known violinist and bought the house from Helena after Richard’s death. Most of the cast changes: Rosemary Harris, Jennifer Ehle's mother, plays Calypso in old age, Virginia McKenna the older Polly, Claire Bloom Sophy, and Richard Johnson Oliver, who is now a well-known author. Oliver says he has had two failed marriages to Calypso lookalikes. He and Sophy find they are both single and leave the funeral together, planning to get to know each other.

The house now belongs to Pauli, who plans to redevelop it and replace the camomile lawn with a swimming pool.

Cast

 Toby Stephens as Oliver Ansty
 Jennifer Ehle as Calypso
 Tara Fitzgerald as Polly
 Felicity Kendal as Helena Cuthbertson
 Paul Eddington as Richard Cuthbertson
 Rebecca Hall as Sophy
 Ben Walden as Walter
 Jeremy Brook as Paul
 Joss Brook as David
 Richard Syms as Rector
 Jane Evers as Mildred Floyer
 James Gaddas as Tony
 Nicholas Le Prevost as Hector and Hamish Grant
 Polly Adams as Sarah Ansty, Oliver’s mother
 Oliver Cotton as Max Erstweiler
 Trudy Weiss as Monika Erstweiler
 Richard Vernon as General Peachum
 Vivienne Ritchie as Iris
 John Elmes as James
 Rosemary Harris as older Calypso
 Virginia McKenna as older Polly
 Claire Bloom as older Sophy
 Richard Johnson as older Oliver
 Ralph Michael as older Tony
 Martin Benson as Pauli Erstweiler

Locations and production
The principal film locations were at Broom Parc House, Veryan, Cornwall, the nearby village of Portloe, and central London.

The younger leading actors, Toby Stephens and Jennifer Ehle, were both playing their first screen roles. The scriptwriter, Ken Taylor, was the father of Matthew Taylor, member of parliament for this part of Cornwall. Ehle's screen career was launched by the television drama, in which she played a role that required multiple nude scenes. "I haven't done any nudity since - and never will again," she later said. "When I took the job, I didn't realize there would be so much of it, but no one forced me to do it. The first time I felt really shocked - then came a whole day of naked scenes. I went home and was physically sick. But it wasn't the time or place to sit down and ask why I'd done it. I'd forgotten that I'd be seen naked in a lot of living rooms."

Reception
The Camomile Lawn achieved unprecedented viewing figures for Channel 4, its success not exceeded until Humans was broadcast more than twenty years later.

Musical score
The theme tune for the adaptation, by Stephen Edwards, is based on Ravel's String Quartet in F major, a piece of music rehearsed in the action by Max (Oliver Cotton) and his colleagues.

Episodes (DVD release)

Notes

External links
 
 

1990s British drama television series
1992 British television series debuts
1992 British television series endings
1990s British television miniseries
British television films
Films based on British novels
Television series set in the 1930s
Television series set in the 1940s
Television series set in the 1980s
Television shows set in Cornwall
Television series produced at Pinewood Studios
World War II television drama series